George Carroll "Spike" Thomas, Jr. (March 4, 1928 – May 23, 1989) was an American football halfback and defensive back in the National Football League for the Washington Redskins and the New York Giants.

College career 
Thomas was a standout high school basketball player, which led to his being recruited to play college basketball for Tulane University.  However, first year OU football coach, Jim Tatum, convinced him to stay in Oklahoma and play college football at the University of Oklahoma.

Thomas was a standout for the Sooners, lettering in '46, '47, '48 and '49. He earned All-American status in 1949. Thomas graduated from OU with a degree in Business Administration in 1950.

NFL career

Washington Redskins 
Thomas was drafted sixth overall in the 1950 NFL Draft by the Washington Redskins. He played two seasons with the Redskins in 1950 and 1951, compiling a total of 371 yards (200 receiving and 171 rushing) and two touchdowns over 24 games, three of which were starts.

New York Giants 
In 1952, Thomas played with the New York Giants in seven games with five starts.

References

See also
 List of NCAA major college football yearly scoring leaders
 List of Oklahoma Sooners football All-Americans

1928 births
1989 deaths
American football defensive backs
American football halfbacks
New York Giants players
People from Fairland, Oklahoma
Washington Redskins players
Oklahoma Sooners football players